Terrimonas crocea is a Gram-negative, rod-shaped, aerobic, non-spore-forming and non-motile  bacterium from the genus of Terrimonas which has been isolated from the glacier Midtre Lovénbreen from Norway.

References

External links
Type strain of Terrimonas crocea at BacDive -  the Bacterial Diversity Metadatabase

Chitinophagia
Bacteria described in 2017